High Friarside is a village in County Durham, England. It is situated a short distance to the west of Burnopfield.

References

Villages in County Durham